X-Jet or XJet may refer to:

In aircraft
X-Jet (engine), a type of pulsejet engine
 * xjet, a YouTube channel by Bruce Simpson
Williams X-Jet, a single-person lightweight aircraft

In fiction
X-Jet (comics), also known as Blackbird, a fictional aircraft in Marvel comic books

See also
ExpressJet, an American airline
Cross-Jet, a Rabasa Cycles model
 JET-X, Joint European Telescope for X-ray astronomy
 X-Jet, a defunct Austrian airline